Toraf Hossain Mandal is an Indian Politician from the state of West Bengal.He is a  member of the West Bengal Legislative Assembly.

Constituency
He represents the Kumarganj (Vidhan Sabha constituency).

Political Party  
He is from the All India Trinamool Congress.

References 

West Bengal MLAs 2016–2021
Living people
Trinamool Congress politicians from West Bengal
Year of birth missing (living people)
People from Dakshin Dinajpur district